Carl Van Vechten (June 17, 1880December 21, 1964) was an American writer and artistic photographer who was a patron of the Harlem Renaissance and the literary executor of Gertrude Stein. He gained fame as a writer, and notoriety as well, for his 1926 novel Nigger Heaven. In his later years, he took up photography and took many portraits of notable people. Although he was married to women for most of his adult years, Van Vechten engaged in numerous homosexual affairs over his lifetime.

Life and career
Born in Cedar Rapids, Iowa, he was the youngest child of Charles Duane Van Vechten and Ada Amanda Van Vechten (née Fitch).  Both of his parents were well educated. His father was a wealthy, prominent banker. His mother established the Cedar Rapids Public Library and had great musical talent. As a child, Van Vechten developed a passion for music and theatre. He graduated from Washington High School in 1898.

After high school, Van Vechten was eager to take the next steps in his life, but found it difficult to pursue his passions in Iowa. He described his hometown as "that unloved town". To advance his education, he decided in 1899 to study at the University of Chicago, where he studied a variety of topics including music, art and opera. As a student, he became increasingly interested in writing and wrote for the college newspaper, the University of Chicago Weekly.

After graduating from college in 1903, Van Vechten accepted a job as a columnist for the Chicago American. In his column "The Chaperone", Van Vechten covered many different topics through a style of semi-autobiographical gossip and criticism. During his time with the Chicago American, he was occasionally asked to include photographs with his column. This was the first time he was thought to have experimented with photography, which later became one of his greatest passions. Van Vechten was fired from his position with the Chicago American because of what was described as an elaborate and complicated style of writing. Some described his contributions to the paper as "lowering the tone of the Hearst papers". In 1906, he moved to New York City. He was hired as the assistant music critic at The New York Times. His interest in opera had him take a leave of absence from the paper in 1907 to travel to Europe and explore opera.

While in England, he married Anna Snyder, his long-time friend from Cedar Rapids. He returned to his job at The New York Times in 1909, where he became the first American critic of modern dance. Through the guidance of his mentor, Mabel Dodge Luhan, he became engrossed in the avant garde. He began to frequently attend groundbreaking musical premieres at the time when Isadora Duncan, Anna Pavlova, and Loie Fuller were performing in New York City. He also attended premieres in Paris where he met American author and poet Gertrude Stein in 1913. He became a devoted friend and champion of Stein and was considered to be one of Stein's most enthusiastic fans. They continued corresponding for the remainder of Stein's life, and, at her death, she appointed Van Vechten her literary executor; he helped to bring into print her unpublished writings. A collection of the letters between Van Vechten and Stein has been published.

Van Vechten wrote a piece called "How to Read Gertrude Stein" for the arts magazine The Trend. In his piece, Van Vechten attempted to demystify Stein and bring clarity to her works. Van Vechten came to the conclusion that Stein can be best understood when one has been guided through her work by an "expert insider". He writes that "special writers require special readers".

The marriage to Anna Snyder ended in divorce in 1912, and he wed actress Fania Marinoff in 1914. Van Vechten and Marinoff were known for ignoring the social separation of races during the times and for inviting blacks to their home for social gatherings. They were also known to attend public gatherings for black people and to visit black friends in their homes.

Although Van Vechten's marriage to his wife Fania Marinoff lasted for 50 years, they often had arguments about Van Vechten's affairs with men. Van Vechten was known to have romantic and sexual relationships with men, especially Mark Lutz. Lutz (1901–1968) grew up in Richmond, Virginia, and was introduced to Van Vechten by Hunter Stagg in New York in 1931. Lutz was a model for some of Van Vechten's earliest experiments with photography. The friendship lasted until Van Vechten's death. At Lutz's death, as per his wishes, the correspondence with Van Vechten, amounting to 10,000 letters, was destroyed. Lutz donated his collection of Van Vechten's photographs to the Philadelphia Museum of Art.

Several books of Van Vechten's essays on various subjects, such as music and literature, were published between 1915 and 1920, and Van Vechten also served as an informal scout for the newly formed Alfred A. Knopf. Between 1922 and 1930 Knopf published seven novels by him, starting with Peter Whiffle: His Life and Works and ending with Parties. His sexuality is most clearly reflected in his intensely homoerotic portraits of working-class men.

As an appreciator of the arts, Van Vechten was extremely intrigued by the explosion of creativity which was occurring in Harlem. He was drawn towards the tolerance of Harlem society and the excitement it generated among black writers and artists. He also felt most accepted there as a gay man. Van Vechten promoted many of the major figures of the Harlem Renaissance, including Paul Robeson, Langston Hughes, Ethel Waters, Richard Wright, Zora Neale Hurston and Wallace Thurman. Van Vechten's controversial novel Nigger Heaven was published in 1926. His essay "Negro Blues Singers" was published in Vanity Fair in 1926. Biographer Edward White suggests Van Vechten was convinced that negro culture was the essence of America.

Van Vechten played a critical role in the Harlem Renaissance and helped to bring greater clarity to the African-American movement. However, for a long time he was also seen as a very controversial figure. In Van Vechten's early writings, he claimed that black people were born to be entertainers and sexually "free". In other words, he believed that black people should be free to explore their sexuality and singers should follow their natural talents such as jazz, spirituals and blues. Van Vechten wrote about his experiences of attending a Bessie Smith concert at the Orpheum Theatre in Newark, New Jersey, in 1925.

In Harlem, Van Vechten often attended opera and cabarets. He was credited for the surge in white interest in Harlem nightlife and culture as well as involved in helping well-respected writers such as Langston Hughes and Nella Larsen to find publishers for their early works.

In 2001, Emily Bernard published "Remember Me to Harlem". This was a collection of letters which documented the long friendship between Van Vechten and Langston Hughes, who publicly defended Nigger Heaven. Bernard's book Carl Van Vechten and the Harlem Renaissance: A Portrait in Black and White explores the messy and uncomfortable realities of race, and the complicated tangle of black and white in America.

His older brother Ralph Van Vechten died on June 28, 1927; when Ralph's widow Fannie died in 1928, Van Vechten inherited $1 million invested in a trust fund, which was unaffected by the stock market crash of 1929 and provided financial support for Carl and Fania.

By the start of the 1930s and at the age of 50, Van Vechten was finished with writing and took up photography, using his apartment at 150 West 55th Street as a studio, where he photographed many notable people.

After the 1930s Van Vechten published little writing, though he continued writing letters to many correspondents.

Van Vechten died in 1964 at the age of 84 in New York City. His ashes were scattered over the Shakespeare garden in Central Park. He was the subject of a 1968 biography by Bruce Kellner, Carl Van Vechten and the Irreverent Decades, as well as Edward White's 2014 biography, The Tastemaker: Carl Van Vechten and the Birth of Modern America.

Works
At age 40, Van Vechten wrote the book Peter Whiffle, which established him as a respected novelist. This novel was recognized as contemporary and an important work to the collection of Harlem Renaissance history. In his novel, autobiographical facts were arranged into a fictional form. In addition to Peter Whiffle, Van Vechten wrote several other novels. One is The Tattooed Countess, a disguised manipulation of his memories of growing up in Cedar Rapids. His book the Tiger in the House explores the quirks and qualities of Van Vechten's most beloved animal, the cat.

One of his more controversial novels, Nigger Heaven, was received with both controversy and praise. Van Vechten called this book "my Negro novel". He intended for this novel to depict how African Americans were living in Harlem and not about the suffering of blacks in the South who were dealing with racism and lynchings. Although many encouraged Van Vechten to reconsider giving his novel such a controversial name, he could not resist having an incendiary title. Some worried that his title would take away from the content of the book. In one letter, his father wrote to him, "Whatever you may be compelled to say in the book," he wrote, "your present title will not be understood & I feel certain you should change it."

Many black readers were divided over how the novel depicted African Americans. Some felt that it depicted black people as "alien and strange", and others valued the novel for its representation of African Americans as everyday people, with complexity and flaws just like typical white characters. The novel's supporters included Nella Larsen, Langston Hughes and Gertrude Stein, who all defended the novel for bringing Harlem society and racial issues to the forefront of America.

His supporters also sent him letters to voice their opinions of the novel. Alain Locke sent Van Vechten a letter from Berlin citing his novel Nigger Heaven and the excitement surrounding its release as his primary reason for making an imminent return home. Gertrude Stein sent Van Vechten a letter from France writing that the novel was the best thing he had ever written. Stein also played an important role in the development of the novel.

Well-known critics of this novel included African-American scholar W. E. B. Du Bois and black novelist Wallace Thurman. Du Bois dismissed the novel as "cheap melodrama". Decades after the book was published, literary critic and scholar Ralph Ellison remembered Van Vechten as a bad influence, an unpleasant character who "introduced a note of decadence into Afro-American literary matters which was not needed". In 1981, David Levering Lewis, historian and author of a classic study of the Harlem Renaissance, called Nigger Heaven a "colossal fraud", a seemingly uplifting book with a message that was overshadowed by "the throb of the tom-tom". He viewed Van Vechten as being driven by "a mixture of commercialism and patronizing sympathy".
 Music After the Great War (1915)
 Music and Bad Manners (1916)
 Interpreters and Interpretations (1917)
 The Merry-Go-Round (1918)
 The Music of Spain (1918)
 In the Garret (1919)
 The Tiger in the House (1920)
 Lords of the Housetops (1921)
 Peter Whiffle (1922)
 The Blind Bow-Boy (1923)
 The Tattooed Countess (1924)
 Red (1925)
 Firecrackers. A Realistic Novel (1925)
 Excavations (1926)
 Nigger Heaven (1926)
 Spider Boy (1928)
 Parties (1930)
 Feathers (1930)
 Sacred and Profane Memories (1932)
Posthumous
 The Dance Writings of Carl Van Vechten (1974)

Source:

Archives and museum collections
Most of Van Vechten's personal papers are held by the Beinecke Rare Book & Manuscript Library at Yale University. The Beinecke Library also holds a collection titled "Living Portraits: Carl Van Vechten's Color Photographs of African Americans, 1939–1964", a collection of 1,884 color Kodachrome slides.

The Library of Congress has a collection of approximately 1,400 photographs which it acquired in 1966 from Saul Mauriber (May 21, 1915 – February 12, 2003). There is also a collection of Van Vechten's photographs in the Prentiss Taylor collection in the Smithsonian's Archives of American Art, and a Van Vechten collection at Fisk University. The Museum of the City of New York's collection includes 2,174 of Carl Van Vechten's photographs. Brandeis University's department of Archives & Special Collections holds 1,689 Carl Van Vechten portraits. Van Vechten also donated materials to Fisk University to form the George Gershwin Memorial Collection of Music and Musical Literature.

The Philadelphia Museum of Art currently holds one of the largest collection of photographs by Van Vechten in the United States. The collection began in 1949 when Van Vechten made a gift of sixty of his photographs to the museum. In 1965, Mark Lutz made a gift to the museum of over 12,000 photographs by Van Vechten from his personal collection. Included in the collection are images from extensive portrait sessions with figures of the Harlem Renaissance such as Langston Hughes, Ella Fitzgerald, Billie Holiday, Zora Neale Hurston, and Cab Calloway; artists such as Marcel Duchamp, Henri Matisse, Joan Miró, and Frida Kahlo; and countless other actors, musicians, and cultural figures. Also included in the Mark Lutz gift is an extensive body of photographs Van Vechten took at the 1939 New York World's Fair as well as a large number of photographs depicting scenes across Western Europe and Northern Africa taken during Van Vechten's travels in 1935–1936.

In 1980, concerned that Van Vechten's fragile 35 mm nitrate negatives were fast deteriorating, photographer Richard Benson, in conjunction with the Eakins Press Foundation, transformed 50 of the portraits into handmade gravure prints. The album 'O, Write My Name': American Portraits, Harlem Heroes was completed in 1983. That year, the National Endowment for the Arts transferred the Eakins Press Foundation's prototype albums to the permanent collection of the Smithsonian American Art Museum.

The National Portrait Gallery, London, holds 17 of Van Vechten's portraits of leading creative talents of his era.

More than 3,000 Van Vechten portraits, most of which come from the Library of Congress collection, are included in Wikimedia Commons. His public domain photographs illustrate countless Wikipedia entries on mid-century (mostly American) notables. See examples in the gallery below.

 Carl Van Vechten Papers. Yale Collection of American Literature, Beinecke Rare Book and Manuscript Library.
 Carl Van Vechten Papers Relating to African American Arts and Letters. James Weldon Johnson Collection in the Yale Collection of American Literature, Beinecke Rare Book and Manuscript Library.
 Guide to the Carl Van Vechten papers, 1833–1965. Manuscripts and Archives, New York Public Library.
Carl Van Vechten collection of papers, 1911–1964. Berg Collection of English and American Literature, New York Public Library.
Carl Van Vechten theatre photographs, 1932–1943, held by the Billy Rose Theatre Division at the New York Public Library for the Performing Arts
Carl Van Vechten photographs, 1932–1964 at Brandeis University's Archives & Special Collections, contains 1,689 Van Vechten portraits.
Images by Carl Van Vechten in the Collections of the Museum of the City of New York
Living Portraits: Carl Van Vechten's Color Photographs of African Americans, 1939–1964, Beinecke Rare Book and Manuscript Library at Yale University, features a searchable database of 1,884 rare color Kodachrome slides
Portraits by Carl Van Vechten at the National Portrait Gallery, London
Creative Americans: Portraits by Carl Van Vechten at the Library of Congress
Carl Van Vechten's Portraits from the collection of the Beinecke Rare Book and Manuscript Library at Yale University: over 9,000 black-and-white prints
Postcards from Manhattan: The Portrait Photography of Carl Van Vechten at Marquette University: hundreds of portrait postcards sent by Van Vechten to Wisconsin artist Karl Priebe from 1946 to 1956.
Guide to the Carl Van Vechten Photograph Collection 1932-1956 at the University of Chicago Special Collections Research Center

Gallery

References

Notes

Bibliography

 Bird, Rudolph P. (ed.) (1997). Generations in Black and White: Photographs of Carl Van Vechten from the James Weldon Johnson Memorial Collection, University of Georgia Press. 
 Kellner, Bruce (1968). Carl Van Vechten and the Irreverent Decades. Norman: University of Oklahoma Press. 
 Kellner, Bruce (ed.) (1980). A Bibliography of the Work of Carl Van Vechten. Westport: Greenwood Press. 
 Kellner, Bruce (ed.) (1987). Letters of Carl Van Vechten. New Haven: Yale University Press.  
 Smalls, James (2006). The Homoerotic Photography of Carl Van Vechten: Public Face, Private Thoughts. Philadelphia: Temple University Press. 
 White, Edward (2014). The Tastemaker: Carl Van Vechten and the Birth of Modern America. New York: Farrar, Straus and Giroux. 

 Hurston, Zora Neale (1984). Dust Tracks on a Road: An Autobiography. University of Illinois Press.

External links

 
 
 
 
Extravagant Crowd: Carl Van Vechten's Portraits of Women, Beinecke Rare Book and Manuscript Library at Yale University
Booknotes interview with Emily Bernard on Remember Me to Harlem: The Letters of Langston Hughes and Carl Van Vechten, 1925–1964, April 22, 2001.
Stuart A. Rose Manuscript, Archives, and Rare Book Library, Emory University: "Carl Van Vechten: American Portraitist" exhibit materials, 1992 (curated by Deborah Willis)
Carl Van Vechten theatre photographs, 1932-1943, held by the Billy Rose Theatre Division, New York Public Library for the Performing Arts

1880 births
1964 deaths
20th-century American photographers
American people of Dutch descent
Artists from Cedar Rapids, Iowa
Artists from New York City
Bisexual men
American bisexual writers
Harlem Renaissance
American LGBT photographers
LGBT people from Iowa
American portrait photographers
University of Chicago alumni
Writers from Cedar Rapids, Iowa
Writers from New York City